FK Lokomotiva Gradsko is a football club from Gradsko, North Macedonia. They are currently competing in the Macedonian Third League (South Division).

References

External links

Club info at MacedonianFootball 
Football Federation of Macedonia 

Football clubs in North Macedonia
FK